Cheshmeh Sefid (also Romanized as Cheshmeh Sefīd) is a village in Meyami Rural District, in the Central District of Meyami County, Semnan Province, Iran. At the 2006 census, its population was 120, in 33 families.

References 

Populated places in Meyami County